"Come On-a My House" is a song performed by Rosemary Clooney and originally released in 1951. It was written by Ross Bagdasarian and his cousin,  Armenian-American Pulitzer Prize-winning author William Saroyan, while driving across New Mexico in the summer of 1939. The melody is based on an Armenian folk song. The lyrics reference traditional Armenian customs of inviting over relatives and friends and providing them with a generously overflowing table of fruits, nuts, seeds, and other foods.

It was not performed until the 1950 off-Broadway production of The Son. The song did not become a hit until the release of Clooney's recording. It was probably Saroyan's only effort at popular songwriting, and it was one of Bagdasarian's few well-known works that was not connected to his best-known creation, Alvin and the Chipmunks. Bagdasarian, as David Seville, went on to much fame with his Chipmunks recordings.

Rosemary Clooney's original hit version
The song was first performed during 1950 in an off-Broadway production of The Son, but did not become a hit until the release of Clooney's recording.
  
A major hit for Clooney in 1951, it was the first of a number of dialect songs she did. She recorded it in the early part of 1951, with Mitch Miller leading an ensemble of four musicians, including harpsichordist Stan Freeman. It reached number one on the Billboard charts, staying in the top position for six weeks.

Clooney sang the song in the 1953 film The Stars Are Singing, in a scene where she ended up mocking it, remarking that no one would listen to it.

Although she performed "Come On-a My House" for many years, Clooney later confessed that she hated the song. She said she had been given a practice record of it and had told Miller it was not for her. Miller gave her an ultimatum: record the song or be fired. During a 1988 interview, Clooney said that whenever she listened to the recording, she could hear the anger in her voice from being forced to sing it.

Cover versions
The song was covered by Ella Fitzgerald, as one side of a single whose other side was also a cover of a Clooney hit, "Mixed Emotions", on Decca Records (catalog number 27875).
Louis Prima covered it (with an Italian spin) alongside Keely Smith on Sing Loud, released in 1960 by Coronet Records. He also recorded it in 1951 on Robin Hood Records, and again in 1958 on Moonglow.
The song was also a hit for Kay Starr, who added a few lines with funny, nearly surrealistic details, and ended with an even more explicit offer. In 1952, Japanese singer Chiemi Eri covered the Kay Starr version. Della Reese also recorded the song in 1960, and  Madonna mimes her version in the remake of Swept Away. Many have offered an untraditional twist, such as  Mickey Katz singing in Yiddish, Julie London oozing a more blatant sexiness in her version, and Eartha Kitt performing a rendition in Japanese.
It was later used as the theme for the reality television series The Girls Next Door, performed by the Nasty Tales and their orchestra. The Surf Punks remade the song in the late 1980s.
The composers themselves performed it – Bagdasarian singing, Saroyan offering occasional narration – for Coral Records.  Bagdasarian also performs the song on his album The Mixed-Up World of Ross Bagdasarian and Alvin and the Chipmunks sang it for their 1994 Thanksgiving television special A Chipmunk Celebration.  In the 1987 animated movie The Chipmunk Adventure, it is sung briefly by Miss Miller, voiced by Dody Goodman.
American country-music artist K. T. Oslin covered the song on her 2001 album, Live Close By, Visit Often.  Her version reached number 40 on the Billboard Hot Dance Music/Club Play charts. It spent six weeks on the chart before peaking in June 2001. It is her only song to chart on the Dance Club songs list.
It was covered by Captain & Tennille as a bonus track on their 2002 More Than Dancing...Much More CD.
Actress Janis Hansen can be heard singing a version a cappella while showering in "To Steal a Battleship", an episode of the 1968 television series, It Takes a Thief.
 In 1991, Voice Farm recorded the song for their album, Bigger Cooler Weirder.
Salsa legend Celia Cruz also did a cover called "Ven A Mi Casa" with both Spanish and English lyrics.
Bette Midler included a version of the song on her 2003 Rosemary Clooney covers album Bette Midler Sings the Rosemary Clooney Songbook.
Actress/singer Bernadette Peters performs a cover in the Amazon series Mozart in the Jungle (season two, episode four, "Touché Maestro, Touché").

Parody
In late 1951, MGM Records released a novelty answer song, "Where's-a Your House?", which charted on the Cash Box Hot 50 list. Sung by Robert Q. Lewis in dialect, the tune details the singer's frustrated attempts to follow up "Rosie's" invitation.

Also in 1951, Mickey Katz released a Yiddish parody for Capitol Records.  

In 1974, American rock band Sparks titled their third album Kimono My House, a pun on the song's title.

In 1978, on the episode of M*A*S*H entitled "Major Topper", the eccentric "Boot" Miller (played by Hamilton Camp), apparently believing that he is Rosemary Clooney, sings "Come On-a My House" into a "microphone" ladle in the mess tent.

References

1939 songs
1951 singles
Columbia Records singles
Songs written by Ross Bagdasarian
Rosemary Clooney songs
K. T. Oslin songs
Song recordings produced by Mitch Miller
Armenian-American history